Georgia Munro-Cook  is an Australian 4.5 point wheelchair basketball player. She represented Australia at the 2020 Summer Paralympics in Tokyo.

Biography
Munro-Cook was born on 17 May 1994, the daughter of Meg Munro and Murray Cook, one of the original members of the children's band The Wiggles. As a child, she appeared in seven of The Wiggles videos, including Big Red Car, Wake Up Jeff!, Wiggly, Wiggly Christmas, It's a Wiggly Wiggly World, Hoop Dee Doo: It's a Wiggly Party and Yule Be Wiggling. She attended Newtown High School of the Performing Arts, earning high marks in English, Mathematics, Science, Australian History and Australian Geography. , she attended the University of Sydney.

Munro-Cook enjoyed playing basketball, but her career was terminated by a hip injury. However, she soon found a substitute in wheelchair basketball. "It gave me an outlet and a passion to pursue," she recalled. She is a tall forward/centre who is classified a 4.5 point player. In 2014, she joined the Sachs Goudcamp Bears, one of the teams in the Women's National Wheelchair Basketball League. The team was renamed the Sydney Metro Blues in 2016, and won the league championship in 2017. That season, Munro-Cook had five double-doubles. She led the Sydney Metro Blues for scoring, and was second for assists. She was also named to the All-Star Five. She also played for the New South Wales junior side that won the Kevin Coombs Cup in 2016.

In 2015, Munro-Cook was selected as a member of the under 25 national side (the Devils) for the 2015 Women's U25 Wheelchair Basketball World Championship in Beijing. Later that year she played with the senior team, the Gliders, at the 2015 IWBF Asia-Oceania Championships in Chiba, Japan, in October 2015. She subsequently joined the Gliders for the Osaka Cup in Japan in 2016, and the 2017 IWBF Asia-Oceania Championships back in Beijing in October 2017.

She represented Australia at the 2018 Wheelchair Basketball World Championship where the team came ninth.

At the 2020 Tokyo Paralympics, the Gliders finished ninth after winning the 9th-10th classification match.

References

External links
 
 Basketball Australia Profile

Australian women's wheelchair basketball players
Paralympic wheelchair basketball players of Australia
Wheelchair basketball players at the 2020 Summer Paralympics
Living people
Sportswomen from New South Wales
University of Sydney alumni
1994 births
Centers (basketball)
Forwards (basketball)